is a rural district located in Yamagata Prefecture, Japan.
As of August 2013, the district has an estimated population of 42,788 and an area of 1,508.54 km2. All of the city of Shinjō was formerly part of Mogami District.

Towns and villages
Funagata
Kaneyama
Mamurogawa
Mogami
Ōkura
Sakegawa
Tozawa

History
Mogami County was an ancient place name in part of Dewa Province; however, it was located to the south of the present Mogami District, in an area corresponding roughly to modern Higashimurayama District and parts of Nishimurayama District.

Under the Tokugawa shogunate, much of the area of modern Mogami District was ruled as part of Shinjō Domain. Following the Meiji restoration it came under the new province of Uzen Province, which became part of Yamagata Prefecture in 1876. At that time, the area consisted of 2 towns and 86 villages. The area was organized as modern Mogami District in 1878. 
 

With the establishment of the municipality system on April 1, 1889, one towns (Shinjo) and 15 villages were established. Kaneyama was raised to town status on January 1, 1925 and Shinjō was raised to city status on April 1, 1949. Mamurogawa was raised to town status on April 1, 1950 and the towns of Mogami and Funagata were created on September 1 and December 1, 1954.

Districts in Yamagata Prefecture